The Surf Coast Shire is a local government area in the Barwon South West region of Victoria, Australia, located in the south-western part of the state. It includes the towns of Aireys Inlet, Anglesea, Lorne, Moriac, Torquay and Winchelsea. It was formed in 1994 from the amalgamation of the Shire of Winchelsea, Shire of Barrabool and part of the former City of South Barwon, which was, at that point, part of the City of Greater Geelong.

The Shire is governed and administered by the Surf Coast Shire Council; its seat of local government and administrative centre is located at the council headquarters in Torquay. The Shire is named after its location on the popular surf coast of Victoria.

Post-2008, following an electoral representation review, the decision was made to re-subdivide the municipality into four wards, the current wards are Torquay, Anglesea, Winchelsea and Lorne. Between 2004 and 2008, the Shire was an unsubdivided municipality and as a result, the entire municipality voted to elect nine councillors. Between 1996 and 2004, the municipality was subdivided into six wards, where three councillors per ward were elected from the Torquay and Anglesea wards, and one councillor per ward was elected from the Lorne, Winchelsea, Moriac and Aireys Inlet wards. A position of Deputy Mayor was created in 2004, but it was abolished for the 2005 mayoral election.

Council

Current composition
The council is composed of four wards and nine councillors, with four councillors elected to represent the Torquay Ward, two councillors per ward elected to represent each of the Anglesea and Winchelsea wards, and one councillor elected to represent the Lorne Ward.

List of former and current mayors
 Cr Noel Bates (1995–1997)
 Cr Henry Love (1997–1998)
 Cr Julie Hansen (1998–2000)
 Cr Mike Barrow (2000–2001)
 Cr Beth Davidson (2001–2004)
 Cr Keith Grossman (2004–2005)
 Cr Libby Mears (2005–2006)
 Cr Rose Hodge (2006–2007)
 Cr Dean Webster (2007–2008)
 Cr Libby Mears (2008–2009)
 Cr Libby Coker (2009–2010)
 Cr Dean Webster (2010–2011)
 Cr Brian McKiterick (2011–2012)
 Cr Libby Coker (2012–2013)
 Cr Rose Hodge (2013–2014)
 Cr Margot Smith (2014–2015)
 Cr Rose Hodge (2015–2016)
 Cr Brian McKiterick (2016-2017)
 Cr David Bell (2017-2018)
Cr Rose Hodge (2018–2020)
 Cr Libby Stapleton (2020–2022)
 Cr Liz Pattison (2022 -Present)

Administration and Governance
The council meets in the council chambers at the council headquarters in the Torquay Municipal Offices, which is also the location of the council's administrative activities. It also provides customer services at its Municipal Office in Torquay.

Elections
Surf Coast Shire holds elections every 4 years to determine the composition of the council.

2016 election

Anglesea Ward

Lorne Ward
Lorne Ward was uncontested in the 2016 election, with Councillor Clive Goldsworthy being re-elected unopposed.

Torquay Ward

Townships and localities
The 2021 census, the shire had a population of 37,694 up from 29,397 in the 2016 census

^ - Territory divided with another LGA

See also
 List of localities (Victoria)

References

External links
Surf Coast Shire Council official website
Great Ocean Road Journey, Victoria, Australia (replaces the Surf Coast Tourist website)
Metlink local public transport map
Link to Land Victoria interactive maps
The Anglesea & District Historical Society Inc.

Local government areas of Victoria (Australia)
Barwon South West (region)